Scanning the Movies is a Canadian educational television series which debuted in September 1997, and takes a look at current films to understand and analyze films impact on pop culture. The show was created by host John Pungente for educators in media literacy. The show is produced by Bravo! Canada. Scanning the Movies is presented in classrooms as part of the Cable in the Classroom project.

External links 
 
 Bravo! Canada website
 Media Awareness Network
 Regis College biography of John Pungente
 Association for Media Literacy
 Jesuit Communications Project

1997 Canadian television series debuts
Canadian motion picture television series
1990s Canadian documentary television series